George Sheridan is the name of:

George Sheridan (footballer) (1929–1986), English footballer
George Sheridan (politician) (1840–1896), American politician